Noel von Grünigen (born 17 April 1995) is a Swiss World Cup alpine ski racer.

He is the son of the Swiss alpine skiing champion Michael von Grünigen.

National titles 
Swiss Alpine Ski Championships
Slalom: 2021

References

External links
 

1995 births
Living people
Swiss male alpine skiers
Competitors at the 2015 Winter Universiade
Noel